Tidd is a surname. Notable people with the surname include:

Emmett H. Tidd (1923–2018), United States Navy vice admiral
Kurt W. Tidd (born 1956), United States Navy admiral
Mark L. Tidd (born 1955), United States Navy rear admiral
William Tidd (1760–1847), legal writer

Fictional characters
Leroy Tidd, a character in the television series Oz